Watrous was a provincial electoral district for the Legislative Assembly of the province of Saskatchewan, Canada, in the area of Watrous, Saskatchewan, east of Saskatoon. Created as "Vonda" before the 2nd Saskatchewan general election in 1908, this constituency was redrawn and renamed "Watrous" in 1934.

This riding was abolished and absorbed into the Arm River district before the 18th Saskatchewan general election in 1975.

Another provincial electoral district named "Watrous" existed from 1995 to 2003.

Members of the Legislative Assembly

Vonda (1908 – 1934)

Watrous (1934 – 1975)

Watrous (1995 – 2003)

Election results

Vonda (1908 – 1934)

|-

|Independent
|Frank Ralph Wright
|align="right"|321
|align="right"|34.26%
|align="right"|–
 
|Provincial Rights
|William Mackay
|align="right"|174
|align="right"|18.57%
|align="right"|–
|- bgcolor="white"
!align="left" colspan=3|Total
!align="right"|937
!align="right"|100.00%
!align="right"|

|-

 
|Conservative
|Frank Ralph Wright
|align="right"|384
|align="right"|23.75%
|align="right"|+5.18

|Independent
|Gilbert A. Lerew
|align="right"|127
|align="right"|7.85%
|align="right"|-26.41
|- bgcolor="white"
!align="left" colspan=3|Total
!align="right"|1,617
!align="right"|100.00%
!align="right"|

|-

 
|Conservative
|Duncan Malcolm McKeller
|align="right"|917
|align="right"|25.70%
|align="right"|+1.95
|- bgcolor="white"
!align="left" colspan=3|Total
!align="right"|3,568
!align="right"|100.00%
!align="right"|

|-

|Independent
|John Hilliard Currie
|align="right"|750
|align="right"|21.92%
|align="right"|-
|- bgcolor="white"
!align="left" colspan=3|Total
!align="right"|3,422
!align="right"|100.00%
!align="right"|

|-

|- bgcolor="white"
!align="left" colspan=3|Total
!align="right"|3,351
!align="right"|100.00%
!align="right"|

|-

|Independent
|George McIntosh
|align="right"|1,517
|align="right"|31.49%
|align="right"|-
|- bgcolor="white"
!align="left" colspan=3|Total
!align="right"|4,817
!align="right"|100.00%
!align="right"|

Watrous (1934 – 1975)

|-

|Farmer-Labour
|Alexander Fraser Murray
|align="right"|1,829
|align="right"|32.00%
|align="right"|–
 
|Conservative
|Chester Cameron McClellan
|align="right"|1,525
|align="right"|26.68%
|align="right"|-
|- bgcolor="white"
!align="left" colspan=3|Total
!align="right"|5,716
!align="right"|100.00%
!align="right"|

|-

 
|CCF
|John Waldbillig
|align="right"|2,181
|align="right"|28.01%
|align="right"|-3.99

 
|Conservative
|Julius W. Stechishin
|align="right"|474
|align="right"|6.09%
|align="right"|-20.59
|- bgcolor="white"
!align="left" colspan=3|Total
!align="right"|7,786
!align="right"|100.00%
!align="right"|

|-
 
|style="width: 130px"|CCF
|Jim Darling
|align="right"|3,801
|align="right"|55.39%
|align="right"|+27.38

 
|Prog. Conservative
|Hugh Smith
|align="right"|749
|align="right"|10.92%
|align="right"|+4.83
|- bgcolor="white"
!align="left" colspan=3|Total
!align="right"|6,862
!align="right"|100.00%
!align="right"|

|-
 
|style="width: 130px"|CCF
|Jim Darling
|align="right"|2,968
|align="right"|43.08%
|align="right"|-12.31

|- bgcolor="white"
!align="left" colspan=3|Total
!align="right"|6,889
!align="right"|100.00%
!align="right"|

|-
 
|style="width: 130px"|CCF
|Jim Darling
|align="right"|3,292
|align="right"|53.46%
|align="right"|+10.38

|- bgcolor="white"
!align="left" colspan=3|Total
!align="right"|6,158
!align="right"|100.00%
!align="right"|

|-
 
|style="width: 130px"|CCF
|Jim Darling
|align="right"|2,734
|align="right"|47.53%
|align="right"|-5.93

|- bgcolor="white"
!align="left" colspan=3|Total
!align="right"|5,752
!align="right"|100.00%
!align="right"|

|-
 
|style="width: 130px"|CCF
|Hans A. Broten
|align="right"|2,444
|align="right"|43.60%
|align="right"|-3.93

 
|Prog. Conservative
|Lauren Kolbinson
|align="right"|366
|align="right"|6.53%
|align="right"|-
|- bgcolor="white"
!align="left" colspan=3|Total
!align="right"|5,606
!align="right"|100.00%
!align="right"|

|-
 
|style="width: 130px"|CCF
|Hans A. Broten
|align="right"|2,725
|align="right"|51.15%
|align="right"|+7.55

|- bgcolor="white"
!align="left" colspan=3|Total
!align="right"|5,327
!align="right"|100.00%
!align="right"|

|-

 
|NDP
|Hans A. Broten
|align="right"|2,557
|align="right"|44.77%
|align="right"|-6.38
 
|Prog. Conservative
|Hugh Kirk
|align="right"|533
|align="right"|9.33%
|align="right"|-
|- bgcolor="white"
!align="left" colspan=3|Total
!align="right"|5,712
!align="right"|100.00%
!align="right"|

|-
 
|style="width: 130px"|NDP
|Don W. Cody
|align="right"|3,318
|align="right"|52.71%
|align="right"|+7.94

 
|Prog. Conservative
|Jack B. Pearce
|align="right"|425
|align="right"|6.75%
|align="right"|-2.58
|- bgcolor="white"
!align="left" colspan=3|Total
!align="right"|6,295
!align="right"|100.00%
!align="right"|

See also 
Electoral district (Canada)
List of Saskatchewan provincial electoral districts
List of Saskatchewan general elections
List of political parties in Saskatchewan
Watrous, Saskatchewan
Vonda, Saskatchewan

References 
 Saskatchewan Archives Board – Saskatchewan Election Results By Electoral Division

Former provincial electoral districts of Saskatchewan